Jesse Lawrence Nading (born July 3, 1985) is a former American football linebacker. He was signed by the Houston Texans as an undrafted free agent in 2008. He played college football at Colorado State.

Early years
At ThunderRidge High School, Highlands Ranch, Colorado, Nading was named the state's Class 4A Defensive Player of the Year in 2002. He was a two-time All-State football selection, also was chosen to All-State basketball and baseball teams in 2002.. He was named to the All-Colorado football team in 2002 and was chosen by the Denver Post as the state's Defensive Player of the Year. He helped ThunderRidge to 2002 and `03 state basketball titles in Class 5A, and was twice named to the state all-tournament team. He led ThunderRidge to 2001 state 4A football championship and holds school record for quarterback sacks in a season, 18. Also excelled  in baseball at ThunderRidge.

College career
In 2007, he started all 12 games at defensive end, collecting 56 tackles (19 solo), 6½ tackles for loss, 3½ sacks, one INT, one pass breakup and three fumble recoveries and was Second-team All-Conference honors. In 2006 as a junior he started at defensive end in 11 of the team's 12 games and made 33 tackles (2 for a loss) ½  a sack and 2 passes broken up. In 2005, he was named honorable mention All-conference and finished season with 56 tackles, 11 tackles for loss and four sacks and one intercepted pass and a  forced fumble. In 2004, he started at defensive end in the first three games. In 2003, he redshirted.

Professional career

Pre-draft
Nading measured 6-4½, 254 pounds at his CSU Pro Day. He had a 4.75 40-yard dash and a vertical leap of 36".

Houston Texans
Nading was signed by the Houston Texans as an undrafted free agent on May 8, 2008. He was signed to the Texans' practice squad on September 3, 2008 and signed to the Texans' active roster on November 19, 2008. He made his NFL debut at Cleveland November 23, 2008. He played on special teams and defensive end, recording 5 tackles.

Nading spent the entire 2009 season on the Texans' practice squad and was re-signed to a future contract on January 5, 2010.

External links
Houston Texans bio
Colorado State Rams bio

1985 births
Living people
People from Highlands Ranch, Colorado
Players of American football from Colorado
American football defensive ends
Colorado State Rams football players
Houston Texans players
Players of American football from Saint Paul, Minnesota